"Treat Her Right" is a song written by Ava Aldridge and Lenny LeBlanc, and recorded by American country music group Sawyer Brown.  It was released in March 1996 as the third single from the album This Thing Called Wantin' and Havin' It All.  The song reached number 3 on the Billboard Hot Country Singles & Tracks chart.

Chart performance
"Treat Her Right" debuted at number 74 on the U.S. Billboard Hot Country Singles & Tracks for the week of March 23, 1996.

Year-end charts

References

1996 singles
1995 songs
Sawyer Brown songs
Music videos directed by Michael Salomon
Curb Records singles
Songs written by Lenny LeBlanc